The Puhinui Reserve is a protected working farm and wetland area in South Auckland, New Zealand, on the shores of the Manukau Harbour. It is the location of the Puhinui Craters, and is an area of historic significance to Waiohua iwi.

Geography and geology

The Puhinui Reserve is a peninsula, found between the Puhinui Creek and the Manukau Harbour. The soil is predominantly composed of ash, alluvium and peat.

The reserve includes the Puhinui Craters, three maar lakes first recognised as volcanic craters in 2011.

Biodiversity

The reserve is the largest area of saltmarsh remaining on the Manukau Harbour, situated on the estuarine tranditional zone between the freshwater Puhinui Creek and the saltwater Manukau Harbour. The sandflats, mangroves and shellbanks support populations of the buff-banded rail and the New Zealand fernbird.

History

Similar to Ihumātao located closeby on the Manukau Harbour, the Puhinui Reserve area has been settled by Tāmaki Māori peoples for at least six hundred years, as a gardening and food gathering area. It is adjacent to the Waokauri / Pūkaki portage, one of the three major points where waka could be hauled between the Manukau Harbour and the east coast, and the Puhinui Creek, which provided access to much of inland the South Auckland area (and to the Manukau Harbour in turn). The area is of particular significance to Waiohua iwi, including Te Ākitai Waiohua and Ngāti Te Ata.

In the 1850s, the land became a part of the McLaughlin family's Puhi Nui estate.

The reserve was purchased by the Manukau City Council in 1991. The reserve is managed as a working sheep and cattle farm, as well as a protected wetland.

References

Farms in New Zealand
Protected areas of the Auckland Region
Manukau Harbour
Nature reserves in New Zealand
Ōtara-Papatoetoe Local Board Area
Te Waiohua
Wetlands of New Zealand